"Laléna" (also spelled "Lalena") is the title of a composition by Donovan. Billboard described the single as a "beautiful and intriguing original ballad."  Cash Box said that "sweet strings accent a hauntingly beautiful folk-flavored ballad which gets stronger with each listen."

History 
In 2004, Donovan revealed that the song was inspired by the actress Lotte Lenya and that the song's lyrics, addressed to a societally marginalized woman, were Donovan's reaction to Lenya's character in the film version of The Threepenny Opera: 

"Laléna" was recorded in a September 1968 session at Olympic Studios produced by Mickie Most, session personnel being Harold McNair on flute, Bobby Orr on drums, Danny Thompson on bass with the Royal Philharmonic strings; John Cameron was the arranger. Donovan was not working toward an album when he recorded "Laléna", having completed the tracks which would comprise his The Hurdy Gurdy Man album in April 1968; that album and the single "Laléna" both were issued in the US in October 1968 

"Laléna" made its first album appearance in 1969 on Donovan's Greatest Hits and was a bonus track on the 2005 CD reissue of The Hurdy Gurdy Man.

In 1975 Donovan recorded a version of the song with Marc Bolan in Munich which has been lost.

In 1978 a bootleg emerged which featured Donovan performing the song in a studio with Paul McCartney on acoustic guitar: this tape was likely made November 1968 at EMI Studios London where McCartney was producing tracks for Mary Hopkin's Postcard, an album on which Donovan played guitar.

Chart performance
In the US, "Laléna" was a Top 40 single in the autumn of 1968, reaching #33 on the Hot 100. (Donovan was at this time unable to have product released in the UK due to a contractual dispute). The single was also a hit in France reaching #22.

Television appearances
Donovan's performed the song on December 8, 1968, on The Smothers Brothers Comedy Hour, along with two other tunes: "Happiness Runs" and "I Love My Shirt".

Other versions 
The song has also been recorded by Deep Purple on their 1969 Deep Purple album 
Helena Vondráčková (in Czech) on her 1970 album Ostrov Heleny Vondráčkové
Jane Olivor on her 1977 album Chasing Rainbows
Trini Lopez recorded a cover of the song on his album The Whole Enchilada.

References

External links
Lalena (Single) - Donovan Unofficial Site

Donovan discography

1968 singles
Donovan songs
Deep Purple songs
Songs written by Donovan
Song recordings produced by Mickie Most
Epic Records singles
1968 songs
Harvest Records singles